Lacroix Glacier is a glacier between Suess Glacier and Matterhorn Glacier, which flows southeast into Taylor Valley in Victoria Land, Antarctica. It was mapped by the British Antarctic Expedition, 1910–13, under Robert Falcon Scott, and named after Alfred Lacroix, as was Mount Lacroix.

References

Glaciers of McMurdo Dry Valleys